The girls' tournament at the 2018 Summer Youth Olympics will be held at the Parque Polideportivo Roca from 7 to 14 October 2018.

Results
All times are Argentina Time (UTC-03:00)

Preliminary round

Pool A

Pool B

Classification round

Ninth- to twelfth-place classification

Eleventh and twelfth place

Ninth and tenth place

Medal round

Quarterfinals

Fifth- to eighth-place classification

Crossover

Seventh and eighth place

Fifth and sixth place

First- to fourth-place classification

Semi-finals

Bronze-medal match

Gold-medal match

Statistics

Final ranking

Goalscorers

References

Field hockey at the 2018 Summer Youth Olympics